Eugeniusz Czajka (March 25, 1927 – February 5, 2011) was a Polish field hockey player who competed in the 1952 Summer Olympics. He was born in Goślinowo, Gniezno County. He was part of the Polish field hockey team, which competed in the 1952 Olympic tournament.

References

External links
 
Eugeniusz Czajka's obituary

1927 births
2011 deaths
Polish male field hockey players
Olympic field hockey players of Poland
Field hockey players at the 1952 Summer Olympics
People from Gniezno County
Sportspeople from Greater Poland Voivodeship